Vera Louise Holme, also known as Jack Holme (29 August 1881 – 1 January 1969), was a British actress and a suffragette. She was known as the Pankhursts' chauffeur.

Early life
Holme was born in Birkdale, Lancashire, England. Her parents were Richard and Mary Holme. She was close with her brother Gordon, who later named his son and daughter Jack and Vera in her honour.

Stage career 
She became an actress. From 1906 to 1907 and 1908 to 1909, she was a member of the women's chorus in the D'Oyly Carte Opera Company's Gilbert and Sullivan London Repertory Seasons at the Savoy Theatre in London. She played cross dressing roles, and it is thought that her nickname "Jack" came from one of her stage characters.

Women's suffrage 
By 1908, she had joined the Actresses' Franchise League, and became involved in the militant suffrage campaigning group the Women's Social and Political Union (WSPU).  One notable escapade was when she hid in the large organ of a public hall in Bristol. Holme waited there overnight with Elsie Howie their objective of shouting "Votes for Women" at a political address by a Liberal MP the next day.

In 1909, Holme was invited to Mary Blathwayt's home at Batheaston where the leading suffragettes met. Significant visitors were asked to plant a tree to record their achievements on behalf of the cause e.g. a prison sentence. 

On 22 November 1911 she was arrested for stone throwing and imprisoned for 5 days in Holloway Prison for "wilfully obstructing the police" but did not go on hunger strike. She sketched images of her cell on her release.

During these years she was best known as the Pankhursts' chauffeur.

With cancer scientist Alice Laura Embleton, Evelina Haverfield and Celia Wray Holme set up the private 'Foosack League' between themselves the membership of which was restricted to women and suffragists; the internal evidence suggests the Foosack League was a lesbian secret society. Certainly, the four were close friends as evidenced by the many letters written between them, particularly during World War I.

First World War work 
Upon the outbreak of war in 1914 Holme joined Evelina Haverfield's Women's Volunteer Reserve, and went on to join the Scottish Women's Hospitals for Foreign Service (SWH) as an ambulance driver in their transport unit. She was Haverfield's partner and she was appointed a major. She was based in Serbia and Russia. Holme was imprisoned again; this time she spent some months as a prisoner of war in Austria. In 1917 she was sent back to England to carry a personal message from Dr Elsie Inglis to Lord Derby, the Secretary of State for War. In 1918, in recognition of her work with the SWH, Holme was awarded the Samaritan Cross by the King of Serbia, and a Russian medal for Meritorious Service.

Post War 
Holme helped to set up the Haverfield Fund for Serbian Children, and maintained links with Serbia after Evelina Haverfield's death in 1920. In the 1920s, She moved to Scotland, and shared a home with artists Dorothy Johnstone and Anne Finlay. She became an active member of her local Women's Institute.

Personal life 
Holme had met Haverfield before the war, and they were companions from 1911 until Haverfield's death in 1920. Although during 1919 she was living in Kirkcudbright where she had an affair with the artist Dorothy Johnstone, Holme was left £50 a year for life by Haverfield. In the 1920s, she spent time with Christabel Marshall's ménage à trois partners, Edith Craig and Clare Atwood. She was known throughout her life for adoption of masculine dress and mannerisms, well documented in the photographs held in her archive.

Holme died in 1969 in Glasgow. Her archive is held at the Women's Library at the LSE.

References

1881 births
1969 deaths
British stage actresses
20th-century British women opera singers
Eagle House suffragettes
Scottish Women's Hospitals for Foreign Service volunteers
Women's Social and Political Union
British lesbian actresses
English LGBT people
LGBT feminists